The Archdeacon of Berkshire (also rendered Archdeacon of Berks) is a senior ecclesiastical officer in the Church of England Diocese of Oxford. The archdeacon is the head of the archdeaconry of Berkshire, a post historically found within the diocese of Salisbury, and then, from 7 October 1836, within Oxford diocese.

List of archdeacons
Some archdeacons without territorial titles are recorded from around the time of the Norman Conquest; see Archdeacon of Salisbury.

High Medieval
–aft. 1156: Roger
bef. 1173–bef. 1205: Geoffrey de Vernun
bef. 1206–aft. 1215: Alberic
aft. 1204–aft. 1222: Geoffrey
bef. 1224–aft. 1236: William of Merton
: Clement
: William de Raley
bef. 1237–aft. 1255: Giles of Bridport
: William
bef. 1266–aft. 1268: Walter Scammel
bef. 1275–bef. May 1284: Stephen of Newbury
aft. June 1284–bef. 1313: William de Berges

Late Medieval
10 March 1313–bef. December 1313: Richard de Bello
bef. December 1313–bef. August 1331 (d.): Tydo de Varesio
14 September 1317: Gilbert de Stapleton (ineffective royal grant)
21 August 1331–aft. 1333: Robert de Ayleston (previously Archdeacon of Wiltshire)
bef. 1334–aft. 1359: Edmund de la Beche (collated 12 September 1339)
aft. 1359–bef. 1365 (res.): Thomas Paxton
10 December 1365 – 1366 (res.): John Harewell
bef. 1371–aft. 1384: Guillaume Cardinal d'Aigrefeuille(Cardinal-priest of St Stephen al Monte Celio)
26 October 1389–aft. 1392: Thomas Yokflete
papal grants:
?–1390: Andrea Cardinal Bontempi Martini(Cardinal-priest of SS Marcellinus and Peter)
1390–22 April 1395 (exch.): Christopher Cardinal Marini(Cardinal-priest of San Ciriaco alle Terme Diocleziane)
22 April 1395 – 25 November 1397 (res.): Walter Cook
royal grants:
22 September 1395: John Southam
28 September 1395: Walter Cook
20 October 1395: Ralph Repyngton
: John Wynwyk
9 February 1397 – 30 January 1404 (exch.): John Southam (afterwards Archdeacon of Oxford)
30 January–15 March 1404 (d.): Thomas Southam
bef. 10 June 1404–?: John Fraunceys
aft. 10 June–26 December 1404 (exch.): Simon Sydenham
26 December 1404– (exch.): Walter Medford
–bef. 31 May 1427: Peter de Alcobasso
25 June 1427 – 1431 (res.): Thomas Brunce
15 September 1431–bef. 1432: John Castell (possibly the Master of Univ)
24 September 1432 – 1433 (d.): Alexander Sparrow
18 October 1433 – 1462 (d.): John Norton (probably the Chancellor of Oxford)
15 February 1462 – 1464 (d.): Richard Ewen
9 March 1464 – 1465 (res.): Robert Stillington

28 February 1466 – 1476 (res.): John Russell
6 November 1476 – 1478 (res.): John Morton
31 December 1478 – 1482 (res.): Richard Martyn (also Archdeacon of London and Archdeacon of Hereford; became Bishop of St David's)
bef. 1 December 1488 – 1492 (res.): Oliver King
15 January 1493 – 1507 (res.): Stephen Bereworth
5 February 1507 – 1509 (d.): Christopher Twineho
20 December 1509 – 24 December 1510 (res.): Stephen Bereworth (again)
24 December 1510 – 1522 (d.): William Grey
14 February 1522 – 1545 (d.): Robert Audley

Early modern
18 July 1545 – 1547 (d.): John Crayford (also Master of University College, Oxford, 1546-7)
24 September 1547 – 3 September 1557 (d.): William Pye (afterwards Dean of Chichester)
24 September 1557 – 12 June 1588 (d.): Thomas Whyte
16 June 1588 – 1605 (d.): Martin Culpepper, Dean of Chichester
9 November 1605–bef. 1631 (d.): Leonel Sharp (imprisoned for sedition)
26 January 1631 – 1634 (res.): Edward Davenant
20 November 1634 – 19 August 1665 (d.): John Ryves
29 August 1665 – 1673 (res.): Peter Mews
26 April 1673 – 1689 (res.): John Sharp (also Dean of Norwich from 1681)
6 December 1689 – 1698 (res.): William Richards
12 May 1698–bef. 1710 (d.): Jonas Proast
25 April 1710 – 2 December 1716 (d.): Richard West
13 May 1717 – 9 December 1720 (d.): Edward Talbot
10 January 1721 – 1735 (res.): Martin Benson
8 March 1735 – 9 December 1746 (d.): Samuel Knight
2 January 1747 – 21 October 1763 (d.): John Spry
25 October 1763 – 23 October 1785 (d.): William Dodwell
12 November 1785 – 15 October 1817 (d.): Arthur Onslow (also Dean of Worcester from 1795)
5 December 1817 – 25 August 1832 (d.): John Fisher
7 September 1832–1836: Edward Berens
Archdeaconry transferred to Diocese of Oxford, 7 October 1836
1836–1855 (res.): Edward Berens
21 March 1855 – 3 September 1869 (res.): James Randall

Late modern
1870–1903 (res.): Alfred Pott
1903–17 March 1922 (d.): William Ducat
1922–1942 (res.): Richard Wickham Legg
1942–1954 (res.): Arthur Parham, Bishop suffragan of Reading
1955–1967 (res.): Eric Knell, Bishop suffragan of Reading
1968–1973 (res.): Eric Wild (also Bishop suffragan of Reading from 1972)
1973–1976 (res.): Raymond Birt
1978–1986 (res.): John Brown
1987–1992 (res.): David Griffiths
1992–1998 (res.): Mike Hill
1998–31 May 2013 (ret.): Norman Russell
11 October 201319 November 2019: Olivia Graham (became Bishop of Reading)
29 February 2020present: Stephen Pullin

References

Sources

Account of Purley on Thames – Archdeacons (PDF) (accessed 4 December 2012)

Lists of Anglicans